Martignacco is a comune (municipality) in the Province of Udine in the Italian region Friuli-Venezia Giulia, located about  northwest of Trieste and about  northwest of Udine.

Martignacco borders the following municipalities: Basiliano, Fagagna, Moruzzo, Pagnacco, Pasian di Prato, Tavagnacco.

References

External links
 Official website

Cities and towns in Friuli-Venezia Giulia